Sławniowice  is a village in the administrative district of Gmina Głuchołazy, within Nysa County, Opole Voivodeship, in south-western Poland, on the Czech border.

The village has a population of 550 and is famous for its marble quarry. Marble work (both quarrying and refining) is currently the village's main industry.

History
The present-day Polish village Sławniowice and the present-day Czech village Velké Kunětice, directly across the Czech side of the border, were once a single village. After the Silesian Wars, the newly drawn border divided the village in two. The division continued through the Communist era of 1945–1990, and the border was not easily crossed until the two countries joined the Schengen Area in 2007.

References

Villages in Nysa County
Czech Republic–Poland border crossings